Reverend Smith  may refer to:

People
George Smith (chaplain) (1845–1918), Army chaplain, defender of Rorke's Drift during the Zulu War of 1879
Gordon V. Smith (1906-1997), Episcopal Church bishop in the United States
Henry Weston Smith (1827–1876) of Deadwood
John Smith Moffat (1835–1918), British missionary and imperial agent in southern Africa
Jonathan Smith Green (1796–1878), missionary from New England to the Kingdom of Hawaii
William Smith (1707–1784), supporter of the American Revolution

Fiction
The Reverend James Smith, character in Things Fall Apart

See also
Smith (surname)